KLM Flight 861, operated by a Boeing 747 registered PH-BUA and named "The Mississippi", was hijacked on 25 November 1973, by three young Arabs over Iraqi airspace on a scheduled Amsterdam-Tokyo flight with 247 passengers on board.

Incident

KLM Flight 861, captained by Issac Risseeuw, was a scheduled flight from Amsterdam (AMS) to Tokyo-Haneda (HND) with planned stops at Athens (ATH), Beirut (BEY) and Delhi (DEL). The airplane was en route over Iraq when it was hijacked by three passengers, claiming to be members of the Arab Youth Organization for the Liberation of Palestine. They forced the plane to Damascus, Nicosia, Tripoli, Malta, and finally Dubai where the hijackers surrendered to authorities. All 247 passengers and 17 crew survived the hijacking.

Aftermath
The hijack was claimed by the Arab Nationalist Youth Organization. The flight number is still used for the Amsterdam to Tokyo direct route.

References

Aircraft hijackings
Terrorist incidents in Asia in 1973
Accidents and incidents involving the Boeing 747
861
Aviation accidents and incidents in 1973
1973 in the Netherlands
Aviation accidents and incidents in Malta
1973 in Malta
November 1973 events in Asia
Terrorist incidents in the United Arab Emirates